Keep It Together is the fourth studio album by the band Guster, released in June 2003. The album was recorded from 2001 to 2003 in Bearsville, New York, New York City, Burbank, California, and Shokan, New York. This is the first album by Guster with Brian Rosenworcel on kit drums instead of hand percussion. Keep It Together went through several working titles, including Bitch Magic, Olympia Dukakis and Come Downstairs & Say Hello.

According to the album's liner notes, Joe Pisapia contributed guest vocals on "Jesus on the Radio" and Ben Kweller did the same on "I Hope Tomorrow Is Like Today". Pisapia officially joined the band in 2003.

The track "Red Oyster Cult" refers to the name of the American rock band Blue Öyster Cult.

A UK re-release included two bonus tracks, "Say That To My Face" and "Starless Heaven". 

The record sold 267,000 copies by late 2005, according to Nielsen Soundscan.

Track listing
All music composed by Guster, except where noted.

When the band plays "Jesus on the Radio" live, they often play it "unplugged", without any instruments or microphones plugged in.

"Keep It Together" can be heard at the end of the season 1 The O.C. episode, "The Rescue".

"I Hope Tomorrow Is Like Today" can be heard in the film Wedding Crashers and in the Malcolm in the Middle episode "Lois' Sister".

Personnel

Guster
Ryan Miller - vocals, bass guitar, guitar, keyboards, mellotron
Adam Gardner - vocals, guitar, banjo, piano
Brian Rosenworcel - drums, percussion, bongos, keyboards, guitar, backing vocals

Guest musicians
Ron Aniello - guitar, Mellotron, banjo
David Henry - cello
Jim Hoke - brass, woodwind
Ben Kweller - guitar, piano, vocals
Jacob Lawson - violin
Randy Leago - brass, woodwind
Brandon Mason - trumpet
Roger Moutenot - Jew's harp
Joe Pisapia - banjo, vocals
Neil Rosengarden - flugelhorn

"Backyard" guest musicians
Every guest musician on Keep It Together was forced to record a take on the song "Backyard". The rule was they could only record one take, and they must have no knowledge of the song before they began recording.
Ron Aniello - additional instruments
David Henry - upright bass
Jim Hoke - harmonica
Ben Kweller - "frightening double-necked string instrument"
Jacob Lawson - additional instruments
Randy Leago - additional instruments
Brandon Mason - additional instruments
Roger Moutenot - Moog synthesizer
Joe Pisapia - banjo
Neil Rosengarden - additional instruments
Josh Rouse - backing vocals

Charts
Album - Billboard (United States)

Singles - Billboard (United States)

See also
 The Meowstro Sings – Guster's Keep It Together

References

Guster albums
2003 albums
Albums produced by Roger Moutenot
Palm Pictures albums
Reprise Records albums

pt:Keep it Together